Scale Lane Footbridge is an apostrophe-shaped pedestrian swing bridge in Hull, England. The bridge has a rotating mechanism, allowing it to swing open horizontally, letting vessels pass beneath on the River Hull. It was the first bridge in the world to allow pedestrians to remain on the bridge while it is in motion.

Background
Planning for the black steel Scale Lane Footbridge began in 2005, and McDowell+Benedetti won a competition. Alan Baxter Ltd was hired as the structural engineer on the project. The bridge officially opened on 28 June 2013. The bridge spans the harbour between Hull's Old Town and an industrial section of the city, and was intended to connect the town centre to a planned housing development. It crosses the old harbour which is connected to the River Humber.

The bridge has a restaurant and other seating for bridge visitors, and cost £7 million. It was the first in the world to allow people to remain on the bridge while it is opening and closing.

Design

The bridge is cantilevered and it curves upwards to allow small boats to pass beneath and swings open to allow larger boats past. Large gears and electric bevel gears are engaged for the opening and closing mechanism. The main pivot point for the bridge is a  hub.

The bridge rotates slowly laterally, allowing pedestrians to remain on the bridge while it is rotating. The design includes a barrier on the western side to prevent entry, while, on the eastern side, pedestrians can step on and off the bridge while it is in motion. The bridge weighs 1,000 tonnes and has a capacity of 1,000 people per crossing.

From above, the bridge looks like an apostrophe. Locals say that the bridge looks like the flipper in a pinball game. Rowan Moore from The Guardian has said the bridge is designed in the style of Santiago Calatrava.

The bridge allows pedestrians and cyclists, but prohibits motorised vehicles.

Reception
The bridge has earned several awards and has been recognised internationally. Popular Mechanics called it one of the "30 Most Impressive Bridges in the World". The Economic Times included it in a list of "Engineering marvels". The bridge is also featured in the book Britain's Greatest Bridges.

References

External links

Hull’s new swing bridge
Matter Architecture - Scale Lane Bridge
Scale Lane Footbridge opens to let a barge go through

Bridges in England
Bridges in Kingston upon Hull
Swing bridges in England
Bridges completed in 2013